AK Pyxidis is a  semiregular variable star located in the constellation Pyxis. It varies between magnitudes 6.09 and 6.51, pulsating to multiple periods simultaneously of  55.5, 57.9, 86.7, 162.9 and 232.6 days. Located around 1228 light-years distant, it shines with a luminosity approximately 1500 times that of the Sun and has a surface temperature of 3410 K.

References

Pyxis (constellation)
Semiregular variable stars
M-type giants
Pyxidis, AK
Durchmusterung objects
75306
043215